Gnathophis nystromi (known commonly as the conger eel) is an eel in the family Congridae (conger/garden eels). It was described by David Starr Jordan and John Otterbein Snyder in 1901, originally under the genus Leptocephalus. It contains two subspecies, Gnathophis nystromi nystromi, and Gnathophis nystromi ginanago, which was described by Hirotoshi Asano in 1958, originally under the genus Rhynchocymba.

G. nystromi nystromi is a tropical, marine eel which is known from the western Pacific Ocean, including Japan, the South China Sea, and Hawaii. It dwells at a depth range of 250–355 meters, and inhabits reefs.

G. nystromi ginanago is a marine, temperate water-dwelling eel which is known from Japan, in the northwestern Pacific Ocean. Males can reach a maximum total length of 40 centimeters.

References

nystromi
Fish described in 1901
Taxa named by David Starr Jordan